Jakob Schüller (26 June 1905 – 22 January 1944) was a German sprint runner. He competed at the 1928 Olympics in the 200 m and finished in sixth place. He was killed in action during World War II.

References

1905 births
1944 deaths
Sportspeople from Duisburg
Athletes (track and field) at the 1928 Summer Olympics
Olympic athletes of Germany
German male sprinters
German military personnel killed in World War II
20th-century German people
Military personnel from Duisburg